Sausage is a type of prepared meat.

Sausage may also refer to:

 Sausage (band), a funk metal band fronted by Les Claypool
 Sausage dog, nickname for a Dachshund
 Sausage Software, a now defunct creator of web editing software
 Sausage Galaxy, a former dwarf galaxy that accreted in a violent collision into the Milky Way
 The sausage, the name of the device detonated in the Ivy Mike nuclear test
 Sausage (album), a 1992 album by Baboon

See also